GIOP may refer to:
 General Inter-ORB Protocol
 glucocorticoid-induced osteoporosis